The Tanganyika clown (Eretmodus cyanostictus), also known as the striped goby cichlid, is a small species of fish in the family Cichlidae. It is found in the Tanzanian and Zambian shorelines of Lake Tanganyika.

References

Tanganyika clown
Fish described in 1898
Taxa named by George Albert Boulenger
Taxonomy articles created by Polbot